Adrián Palomares Villaplana (born 18 February 1976 in Carcaixent) is a Spanish former professional road cyclist.

Major results

2001
 1st  Overall Troféu Joaquim Agostinho
2005
 2nd Overall Euskal Bizikleta
2006
 2nd Grand Prix de Fourmies
 4th Overall Volta ao Alentejo
 8th Overall Clásica Internacional de Alcobendas
 9th Clásica de Almería
2007
 2nd Overall Tour of Britain
1st Stage 4
 5th Overall Regio-Tour
1st Stage 5 
2008
 3rd Overall Euskal Bizikleta
 9th GP Villafranca de Ordizia
2009
 1st  Overall GP CTT Correios de Portugal
1st Stage 3
2011
 10th Overall Vuelta a la Comunidad de Madrid
2012
 1st Stage 5b Vuelta Ciclista de Chile
 3rd Overall Tour of Turkey
 9th Overall Route du Sud
2013
 1st Prologue (TTT) Volta a Portugal

References

External links

1976 births
Living people
Spanish male cyclists
Cyclists from the Valencian Community
People from Ribera Alta (comarca)
Sportspeople from the Province of Valencia